Jubair Ahmed (born 10 February 1987) is a Bangladeshi cricketer. He is a right-handed batsman and right-arm fast-medium bowler, and a first-class cricketer who represents Rajshahi Division and Barisal Burners in the Bangladesh Premier League. He made his debut for Rajshahi Division in April 2005 against Sylhet Division.

References

External links
 

1987 births
Living people
Bangladeshi cricketers
Rajshahi Division cricketers
Fortune Barishal cricketers
Victoria Sporting Club cricketers
Partex Sporting Club cricketers
Prime Doleshwar Sporting Club cricketers
Bangladesh East Zone cricketers
People from Rajshahi District